The shortarse feelerfish (Bathymicrops brevianalis) is a deepsea tripod fish of the genus Bathymicrops. It is so named because of its almost non-existent eyes (which do exist, just are small and vestigial) and short anal fins. The Latin species name brevianalis means "short anus". The "Sampling the Abyss" project found the fish again in 2017 off the coast of Australia for the first time in 140 years.

References

External links
 Shortarse Feelerfish, Bathymicrops brevianalis Nielsen 1966, Fishes of Australia

Ipnopidae
Fish described in 1966